Bokin, Boulkiemdé is a village in the Soaw Department of Boulkiemdé Province in central western Burkina Faso. As of 2005,  it had a reported population of 242.

References

Populated places in Boulkiemdé Province